Lyubov A. Kuznetsova (Russian: Любовь Алексеевна Кузнецова; born 1928) is a Russian calligrapher and font designer. 

The official digital version of the Literaturnaya font was developed at ParaGraph in 1996 by her.

References

External links
 Biography in Russian at Paratype
 Biography at MyFonts

1928 births
Living people
Russian calligraphers